SMS V185 was a S-138-class large torpedo boat of the Imperial German Navy. She was built by the AG Vulcan shipyard at Stettin in 1910, launching on 9 April that year.

V185 took part the First World War, serving in the North Sea and the Baltic, and was renamed T185 in February 1918. She continued in service following the end of the war, becoming a control boat for the target ship  in 1932 when she was renamed Blitz. She was ceded to the Soviet Union in 1945 at the end of the Second World War and was renamed Vystrel.

Construction and design
The Imperial German Navy ordered 12 large torpedo boats (Große Torpedoboote) as part of the fiscal year 1909 shipbuilding programme, with two ships (G175 and G176) ordered from  Germaniawerft, four (S176–S179) from Schichau-Werke and the remaining six ships (V180–V185) from AG Vulcan.

The ship was armed with two 8.8 cm L/45 guns, one on the forecastle and one aft. Four single 50 cm (19.7 in) torpedo tubes were fitted, with two on the ship's beam in the gap behind the ship's bridge and fore funnel, and two aft of the second funnel. The ship had a crew of 84 officers and men.

V185 was laid down at AG Vulcan's Stettin shipyard as Yard number 300 and was launched on 9 April 1910 and completed on 20 September 1910.

Modifications
The ship was modified with two 10.5 cm L/45 guns replacing the 8.8.cm guns in the 1920s, while her boilers were converted to oil firing in 1923–1934. By 1928 the ship's forecastle had been extended further rearward.

Service

First World War
On 23 January 1915, a German force of battlecruisers and light cruisers, escorted by torpedo boats, and commanded by Admiral Franz von Hipper, made a sortie to attack British fishing boats on the Dogger Bank. V185, part of the 15th Half-flotilla, formed part of the escort for Hipper's force.  British Naval Intelligence was warned of the raid by radio messages decoded by Room 40, and sent out the Battlecruiser Force from Rosyth, commanded by Admiral Beatty aboard  and the Harwich Force of light cruisers and destroyers, to intercept the German force. The British and German Forces met on the morning of 24 January in the Battle of Dogger Bank. On sighting the British, Hipper ordered his ships to head south-east to escape the British, who set off in pursuit. The armoured cruiser  was disabled by British shells and was sunk, but the rest of the German force escaped, with the German battlecruiser  and the British battlecruiser  badly damaged.

In May 1915, V185, as part of the 15th Half-flotilla of the 8th Torpedo Boat flotilla, was deployed to the Baltic Sea to reinforce the German naval forces in the Baltic, which were deployed to support the German Army's advance on Libau (now Liepāja), Latvia. The 8th Torpedo Boat flotilla, including V185 was again deployed to the Baltic in July 1915. V185 took part in a sortie to the north of Gotland on 10–11 July. In August 1915 the Germans detached a large portion of the High Seas Fleet for operations in the Gulf of Riga in support of the advance of German troops. It was planned to enter the Gulf via the Irben Strait, defeating any Russian naval forces and mining the entrance to Moon Sound.

In October 1917, the Germans carried out Operation Albion, an amphibious assault to capture Ösel and Muhu islands off the coast of Estonia. V185, still part of the 15th Half-flotilla of the 8th Torpedo Boat flotilla, took part in Operation Albion.

In 1918, V185 joined an escort flotilla, and was renamed T185 on 22 February 1918. She remained a member of the 1st Half-flotilla of the 1st Escort Flotilla at the end of the war.

Between the wars
After the end of the First World War, the scuttling of the German High Seas Fleet at Scapa Flow on 21 June 1919 and the Treaty of Versailles left Germany with a small navy of obsolete warships.  T185 was one of four destroyers which Germany was allowed to keep in reserve, (with guns mounted, but without stores or ammunition) alongside twelve active destroyers. In 1932, T185 was converted to serve as a control vessel for the radio-target vessel (and former battleship)  and as a high speed tug, taking the name Blitz, which had been used for Zähringens previous control ship (the former T141) on 4 October 1932. Blitz continued as a radio-control ship for Zähringen and later  through to the end of the Second World War. The ship was handed over to the Soviet Union on 8 January 1946, being renamed Vystrel, but her fate in Soviet hands is unknown.

Notes

References

Bibliography

 

 

 

 

Torpedo boats of the Imperial German Navy
World War I torpedo boats of Germany
Ships built in Stettin
1910 ships